This is a list of tennis players who have represented the Ireland Davis Cup team in an official Davis Cup match. Ireland have taken part in the competition since 1923.

Players

References

Davis Cup
Lists of Davis Cup tennis players
Davis Cup